The consensus 1967 College Basketball All-American team, as determined by aggregating the results of four major All-American teams.  To earn "consensus" status, a player must win honors from a majority of the following teams: the Associated Press, the USBWA, the United Press International and the National Association of Basketball Coaches.

1967 Consensus All-America team

Individual All-America teams

AP Honorable Mention:

 Lucius Allen, UCLA
 Joe Allen, Bradley
 Cliff Anderson, Saint Joseph's
 Wes Bialosuknia, UConn
 Tom Boerwinkle, Tennessee
 Russ Critchfield, California
 Mal Graham, NYU
 Gary Gray, Oklahoma City
 Tom Hagan, Vanderbilt
 Shaler Halimon, Utah State
 Harry Holliness, Denver
 Merv Jackson, Utah
 Butch Joyner, Indiana
 Bob Lewis, North Carolina
 Don May, Dayton
 Steve Mix, Toledo
 Craig Raymond, BYU
 Don Smith, Iowa State
 Keith Swagerty, Pacific
 Chris Thomforde, Princeton
 Gary Walters, Princeton
 Michael Warren, UCLA
 Eldridge Webb, Tulsa
 Jo Jo White, Kansas
 Ron Williams, West Virginia
 Sam Williams, Iowa
 Tom Workman, Seattle

See also
 1966–67 NCAA University Division men's basketball season

References

NCAA Men's Basketball All-Americans
All-Americans